Danaea is a fern genus of approximately 50 species in the eusporangiate fern family Marattiaceae. They are small to intermediately large ferns with erect or creeping rhizomes and usually once-pinnate leaves with opposite pinnae. The fertile leaves are contracted, acrostichoid and covered below with sunken, linear synangia. The genus Danaea has a neotropical distribution, occurring from southern Mexico through Central America, the Caribbean and northern South America to Bolivia, Paraguay and the Mata Atlantica in Brazil and Northern Argentina. There is also a population on Isla del Coco (Cocos Island) in the Pacific.

The genus name of Danaea is named after the Greek mythology, Danaë, an Argive princess and mother of the hero Perseus by Zeus.

Two species Danaea carillensis (Costa Rica) and D. simplicifolia (Guianas, Brazil, Trinidad) have simple, undivided leaves, and some other species sometimes have bipinnate leaves (D. atlantica, D. bipinnata, D. nodosa, D. urbanii). One species Danaea kalevala of the Lesser Antilles was named in honour of the Finnish heroic epic Kalevala.

The basal chromosome number for this genus is 2n=80. The type species is Danaea nodosa.

Taxonomy
Danaea is the basal lineage in the Marattiaceae and the oldest fossils are from the Paleocene, a period where rainforests became more abundant. It has radiated in these early rainforests and presently counts about 50 species in 3 sections: sect. Danaea, sect. Arthrodanaea and sect. Holodanaea.

Species

Danaea acuminata Tuomisto & R.C.Moran
Danaea alata Sm. 
Danaea antillensis Christenh.
Danaea atlantica Christenh., E.M.Almeida & L.P.Felix
Danaea arbuscula Christenh. & Tuomisto 
Danaea bicolor Tuomisto & R.C.Moran 
Danaea bipinnata Tuomisto
†Danaea borealis Pabst
Danaea carillensis H.Christ
Danaea cartilaginea Christenh. & Tuomisto
Danaea chococola Christenh.
Danaea crispa Endrés
Danaea danaëpinna Christenh.
Danaea draco Christenh.
Danaea epiphytica Christenh.
Danaea erecta Tuomisto & R.C.Moran 
Danaea excurrens Rosenst.
Danaea falcata Tuomisto & R.C.Moran 
Danaea geniculata Raddi 
Danaea grandifolia Underw.
Danaea humilis T.Moore 
Danaea imbricata Tuomisto & R.C.Moran
Danaea × jamaicensis Underw. (D. jenmanii × D. mazeana)
Danaea jenmanii Underw.
Danaea kalevala Christenh.
Danaea latipinna Tuomisto & R.C.Moran
Danaea leprieurii Kunze
Danaea leussinkiana Christenh.
Danaea lingua-cervina Christenh. & Tuomisto
Danaea longicaudata Tuomisto
Danaea mazeana Underw.
Danaea media Liebmann
Danaea moritziana C.Presl 
Danaea nodosa Sm. 
Danaea oblanceolata Stolze
Danaea × plicata H.Christ (D. carillensis × D. crispa)
Danaea polymorpha Lepr. ex Baker
Danaea quebradensis Christenh.
Danaea riparia Christenh. & Tuomisto 
Danaea sellowiana C.Presl
Danaea simplicifolia Rudge
Danaea tenera C.V.Morton
Danaea trichomanoides Spruce ex T.Moore
Danaea trifoliata Reichenb.
Danaea trinitatensis Christenh. & Tuomisto
Danaea ulei H.Christ
Danaea urbanii Maxon
Danaea ushana Christenh.
Danaea vivax Christenh. & Tuomisto
Danaea xenium Christenh. & Tuomisto
Danaea ypori Christenh.
Danaea wendlandii Reichenb.f.
Danaea zamiopsis Christenh. & Tuomisto

References

 Christenhusz, M. J. M., Tuomisto, H. Metzgar, J. and Pryer, K. M., in press. Evolutionary relationships within the Neotropical, eusporangiate fern genus Danaea (Marattiaceae). Molecular Phylogenetics and Evolution (Elsevier).
 Christenhusz, M.J.M., Tuomisto, H. 2005. Some notes on the taxonomy, biogeography and ecology of Danaea (Marattiaceae). Fern Gazette 17 (5): 217–222.
 Christenhusz, M. J. M. 2006. Three new species of Danaea (Marattiaceae) from French Guiana and the Lesser Antilles. Annales Botanici Fennici 43: 212–219.
 Christenhusz, M. J. M., Tuomisto, H. 2006. Five new species of Danaea (Marattiaceae) from Peru and a new status for D. elliptica. Kew Bulletin 61: 17–30.
 Christenhusz, M. J. M. 2010. Danaea (Marattiaceae) revisited: biodiversity, a new classification and ten new species of a neotropical fern genus. Botanical Journal of the Linnean Society 163: 360–385.
 Tuomisto, H., Moran, R. C. 2001. Marattiaceae. In: Harling, G., Anderson, L. (eds.), Flora of Ecuador 66: 22–170.
 Underwood, L.M. 1902. American Ferns - V, A Review of the Genus Danaea. Bulletin of the Torrey Botanical Club 29(12): 669–679.

Marattiidae
Fern genera